Thelodonti (from Greek: "nipple teeth") is a class of extinct Palaeozoic jawless fishes with distinctive scales instead of large plates of armor.

There is much debate over whether the group represents a monophyletic grouping, or disparate stem groups to the major lines of jawless and jawed fish.

Thelodonts are united in possession of "thelodont scales". This defining character is not necessarily a result of shared ancestry, as it may have been evolved independently by different groups. Thus the thelodonts are generally thought to represent a polyphyletic group, although there is no firm agreement on this point.  On the basis that they are monophyletic, they are reconstructed as being ancestrally marine and invading freshwater on multiple occasions.

"Thelodonts" were morphologically very similar, and probably closely related, to fish of the classes Heterostraci and Anaspida, differing mainly in their covering of distinctive, small, spiny scales. These scales were easily dispersed after death; their small size and resilience makes them the most common vertebrate fossil of their time.

The fish lived in both freshwater and marine environments, first appearing during the Ordovician, and perishing during the Frasnian–Famennian extinction event of the Late Devonian. Traditionally they were considered predominantly deposit-feeding bottom dwellers, but more recent studies have showed they occupied various ecological roles in various parts of the water column, much like modern bony fishes and sharks. In particular, a large variety of species preferred reef ecosystems, and it has been suggested that this preference was the reason for the development of their unique scales, protecting against abrasion and allowing for the development of more flexible bodies than other jawless fish, which had inflexible armors and were restricted to open habitats.

Description 
Very few complete thelodont specimens are known; fewer still are preserved in three dimensions. This is due in part to the lack of an internal ossified (i.e. bony) skeleton; it does not help that the scales are poorly, if at all, attached to one another, and that they readily detach from their owners upon death.

The exoskeleton is composed of many tooth-like scales, usually around 0.5-1.5mm in size. These scales did not overlap, and were aligned to point backwards along the fish, in the most streamlined direction, but beyond that, often appear haphazard in their orientation. The scales themselves approximate the form of a teardrop mounted on a small, bulky base, with the base often containing a small rootlet with which the scale was attached to the fish. The "teardrop" often contains lines, ridges, furrows and spikes running down its length in an array of sometimes complex patterns. Scales found around the gill region were generally smaller than the larger, bulkier scales found on the dorsal/ventral sides of the fish; some genera display rows of longer spikes.

The scaly covering contrasts them with most other jawless fishes, which were armor-plated with large, flat scales.

Aside from scattered scales, some specimens do appear to display imprints, giving an indication of the structure of the whole animal – which appeared to reach 15–30 cm in length. Tentative studies appear to suggest that the fish possessed a more developed braincase than the lampreys, with an almost shark-like outline. Internal scales have also been recovered, some fused into plates resembling gnathostome tooth-whorls to such a degree that some researchers favour a close link between the families.

Despite the rarity of complete fossils, these very rare intact specimens do allow us to gain an insight into the internal organ arrangement of the Thelodonts. Some specimens described in 1993 were the first to be found with a significant degree of three-dimensionality, ending speculations that the Thelodonts were flattened fish. Further, these fossils allowed the gut morphology to be interpreted, which generated much excitement: their guts were unlike those of any other agnathans, and a stomach was clearly visible: this was unexpected, as it was previously thought that stomachs evolved after jaws. Distinctive fork-shaped tails – usually characteristic of the jawed fish (gnathostomes) – were also found, linking the two groups to an unexpected degree.

The fins of the thelodonts are useful in reconstructing their mode of life. Their paired pectoral fins were combined with a single, usually well-developed, dorsal and anal fins; these and the hypercercal and much larger hypocercal lobes forming a heterocercal tail resemble features of modern fish that are associated with their deftness at predation and evasion.

Taxonomy 
Due to the small number of intact fossils, the taxonomy of thelodonts is based primarily on scale morphology. In fact, some thelodont families are only recognised based on their scale fossils.

A recent assessment of thelodont taxonomy by Wilson and Märss in 2009 merges the orders Loganelliiformes, Katoporiida and Shieliiformes into Thelodontiformes, places families Lanarkiidae and Nikoliviidae into Furcacaudiformes on the basis of scale morphology, and establishes Archipelepidiformes as the basal-most order.

A newer taxonomy based on the work of Nelson, Grande and Wilson 2016 and van der Laan 2016.
 Superclass †Thelodontomorphi Jaekel 1911
 Class †Thelodonti Kiaer 1932
 Family †Oeseliidae Märss 2005
 Order †Archipelepidiformes Wilson & Märss 2009
 Family †Boothialepididae Märss 1999
 Family †Archipelepididae Märss ex Soehn et al. 2001
 Order †Furcacaudiformes Wilson & Caldwell 1998 (Fork-tailed thelodonts)
 Family †Nikoliviidae Karatajūtė-Talimaa 1978
 Family †Lanarkiidae Obručhev 1949
 Family †Pezopallichthyidae Wilson & Caldwell 1998
 Family †Drepanolepididae Wilson & Marss 2009
 Family †Barlowodidae Märss, Wilson & Thorsteinsson 2002
 Family †Apalolepididae Turner 1976
 Family †Furcacaudidae Wilson & Caldwell 1998
 Clade Thelodontida Stensiö 1958 non Kiaer 1932 s.l.
 Family †Talivaliidae Marss, Wilson & Thorsteinsson 2002
 Family †Longodidae Märss 2006b
 Family †Helenolepididae Wilson & Märss 2009
 Order †Sandiviiformes Karatajūtė-Talimaa & Märss 2004
 Family †Angaralepididae Karatajūtė-Talimaa & Märss 2004
 Family †Stroinolepididae Karatajūtė-Talimaa & Märss 2002
 Family †Sandiviidae Karatajūtė-Talimaa & Märss 2004
 Order †Turiniida Stensiö 1958
 Family †Turiniidae Obručhev 1964
 Order †Thelodontiformes
 Family †Thelodontidae Jordan 1905
 Order †Loganelliiformes Turner 1991
 Family †Nunavutiidae Marss, Wilson & Thorsteinsson 2002
 Family †Loganelliidae Märss, Wilson & Thorsteinsson 2002
 Order †Phlebolepidiformes Berg 1937 s.s.
 Family †Phlebolepididae Berg 1937 corrig.
 Family †Shieliidae Märss, Wilson & Thorsteinsson 2002
 Family †Katoporodidae Soehn et al. 2001 ex Märss, Wilson & Thorsteinsson 2002

Scales 

The bony scales of the thelodont group, as the most abundant form of fossil, are also the best understood – and thus most useful. The scales were formed and shed throughout the organisms' lifetimes, and quickly separated after their death.

Bone – being one of the most resistant materials to the process of fossilisation – often preserves internal detail, which allows the histology and growth of the scales to be studied in detail. The scales consist of a non-growing "crown" composed of dentine, with a sometimes-ornamented enameloid upper surface and an aspidine (acellular bony tissue) base. Its growing base is made of cell-free bone, which sometimes developed anchorage structures to fix it in the side of the fish. Beyond that, there appear to be five types of bone-growth, which may represent five natural groupings within the thelodonts – or a spectrum ranging between the end members, meta- (or ortho-) dentine and mesodentine tissues. Each of the five scale morphs appears to resemble the scales of more derived groupings of fish, suggesting that thelodont groups may have been stem groups to succeeding clades of fish.

Scale morphology, alone, has limited value for distinguishing thelodont species. Within each organism, scale shape varies greatly according to body area, with intermediate scale forms appearing between different areas; furthermore, scale morphology may not even be constant within a given body area. To confuse things further, scale morphologies are not unique to specific taxa, and may be indistinguishable on the same area of two different species.

The morphology and histology of the thelodonts provides the main tool for quantifying their diversity and distinguishing between species – although ultimately using such convergent traits is prone to errors. Nonetheless, a framework of three groups has been proposed, based upon scale morphology and histology.

Thelodonts displayed similar squamation patterns as modern sharks, so functionally they served a similar role. This allows for a clearer observation of their ecological niches. In particular, protection against abrasion seems to have been the original role for these scales.

Ecology 

Most thelodonts were considered deposit feeders, but more recent studies have shown that several species were active swimmers and thus more pelagic. A  large variety of species in particular preferred reef ecosystems. They are mainly known from open shelf environments, but are also found nearer the shore and in some freshwater settings.
The appearance of the same species in fresh- and salt-water settings has led to suggestions that some thelodonts migrated into fresh water, perhaps to spawn. However, the transition from fresh- to salt- water should be observable, as the scales' composition would change to reflect the different environment. This compositional change has not yet been found.

Utility as biostratigraphic markers 

Thelodont scales are globally widespread during the Silurian and Early Devonian times, becoming restricted in range to Gondwana, until their extinction in the Late Devonian (Frasnian). The morphology of some species diversified rapidly enough for the scales to rival the conodonts in utility as biostratigraphic markers, allowing precise correlation of widely spaced sediments.

Evolutionary patterns 

The first major pattern or group of jawless fish with exoskeletons or plated armour, was the Laurentian group, which existed during the Cambrian-Ordovician time. However, the thelodonts (as well as the conodonts, placoderms, acanthodians, and chondrichthyans) are the second major group which are believed to have emerged in the middle Ordovician and lasted near the Late Devonian period. Due to their similar characteristics and chronological time frame of existence, many believe the thelodonts have Laurentian origins.

See also 
 List of thelodont genera
 Morphometrics

Further reading 

 
 A range of images of scales are available in

References

External links 
  Contains some images.
  A phylogeny.

 
Prehistoric fish classes
Paleozoic jawless fish
Middle Ordovician first appearances
Famennian extinctions